Fumba is a village on the Tanzanian island of Unguja, part of Zanzibar. It is located in the southwest of the island, at the end of the Fumba Peninsula, and overlooks Menai Bay.

References
Finke, J. (2006) The Rough Guide to Zanzibar (2nd edition). New York: Rough Guides.

Villages in Zanzibar